The City of Bunbury is a local government area in the South West of Western Australia. It was formed on 21 February 1871 as the Municipality of Bunbury and has had a mayor since June 1887 in celebration of the Golden Jubilee of Queen Victoria. On 23 June 1961, following the passage of the Local Government Act 1960, the municipality was renamed to the Town of Bunbury. On 31 August 1979, upon reaching the required population, the town was renamed to its present name, the City of Bunbury.

Municipality of Bunbury

Town of Bunbury

City of Bunbury

References

Lists of local government leaders in Western Australia